Matúš Sukeľ (born 23 January 1996) is a Slovak professional ice hockey forward who is currently playing under contract with HC Verva Litvínov in Czech Extraliga. He was selected and competed in the 2018 Winter Olympics for Slovakia.

Career statistics

Regular season and playoffs

International

References

External links

1996 births
Living people
Sportspeople from Liptovský Mikuláš
Ice hockey players at the 2018 Winter Olympics
Slovak ice hockey centres
Olympic ice hockey players of Slovakia
MHk 32 Liptovský Mikuláš players
HC Slovan Bratislava players
HC Sparta Praha players
HC Litvínov players
Slovak expatriate ice hockey players in Finland
Slovak expatriate ice hockey players in the Czech Republic